Kilmeague is a village in west County Kildare, Ireland, with a population of 997.

See also
List of towns and villages in Ireland

References

External links
 Kildare County Council site. Separate search required.

Towns and villages in County Kildare